The 1924 United States presidential election in Utah took place on November 4, 1924 as part of the 1924 United States presidential election. All contemporary forty-eight states took part, and state voters selected four voters to the Electoral College, who voted for president and vice president.

Rapid recovery of the economy from a sharp recession following World War I transformed the 1920s into a strongly Republican decade. Even the problematic issue of a farm depression had eased by the time of the election as prices recovered. It was also widely thought that the Teapot Dome scandal could do nothing to revive the Democrats as they were well known to have equally severe problems therewith via the fact that recently deceased Woodrow Wilson had paid one hundred and fifty thousand dollars in legal fees to nomination frontrunner William McAdoo.

Consequently, Utah voters strongly supported incumbent president Calvin Coolidge, who had come to power after Harding's death in 1923. As Harding had done four years earlier, Coolidge won all twenty-nine counties in Utah, a feat to be repeated by later Republican candidates in 1956, 1972, 1980, 1984, 2000, 2004 and 2012. The conservatism of Coolidge and Democratic nominee John W. Davis – the only ever major party presidential nominee from West Virginia and the first from an antebellum slave state (including border states) since the Civil War – led more liberal supporters of both parties to support Progressive Robert M. La Follette. Utah's conservative Mormonism meant that La Follette was not as popular as in other western states, and he finished third well behind Davis. La Follette nonetheless did outpoll Davis in the Wasatch Front counties of Salt Lake and Weber, as well as the eastern, ethnically more diverse Carbon County.

For this election, Utah essentially voted as the nation did, with the state on a two-party basis coming out as 5.90 percent more Democratic than the nation at-large, although the total Davis vote was within one percent of the national average, and the La Follette vote three percent higher than the country at-large, though lower than any state to the north or west. Utah was along with Arizona and New Mexico the only Mountain state where La Follette did not carry any county.

Results

Results by county

See also
 United States presidential elections in Utah

Notes

References

1924 Utah elections
Utah
1924